Angela Sarafyan (June 30, 1983), sometimes credited as Angela Sarafian, is an Armenian-American actress. She has appeared as a guest star in several television series and has acted in the feature films: Kabluey (2007), On the Doll (2007), A Beautiful Life (2008), The Informers (2008), A Good Old Fashioned Orgy (2011), Lost & Found in Armenia (2012), and Reminiscence (2021).  Sarafyan earned supporting roles in blockbuster films such as The Twilight Saga: Breaking Dawn – Part 2 (2012).

From 2016, she portrayed Clementine Pennyfeather on the HBO series Westworld.

Personal life
Sarafyan was born in Yerevan, Armenia, which was then a part of the Armenian SSR, Soviet Union. When she was four, she moved with her parents to the United States, settling in Los Angeles. Her father, Grigor Sarafyan, is an actor, and her mother is a painter. She studied ballet and played piano as a child. She attended Francisco Bravo Medical Magnet High School in Boyle Heights, Los Angeles.

Career

Early work (2000–2006) 
Sarafyan made her acting debut on Judging Amy as Aisha Al-Jamal in the episode "Culture Clash" in 2000. She also appeared in the music video for Britney Spears' song "Stronger", and later appeared on Buffy the Vampire Slayer as Lori in 2002. She made her film debut in The Last Run as Lauren in 2004 and continued to appear in other television series including The Shield, The Division, Wanted, South of Nowhere, 24, and CSI: NY.

Later work (2007–2015) 
After appearing on Cold Case, Sarafyan continued to appear in films including Kabluey and On the Doll in 2007. Sarafyan portrayed Stormy in the web series Sex Ed: The Series followed by small supporting roles in Repo Chick and Love Hurts in 2009. In 2010, Sarafyan joined the cast of The Good Guys, playing offbeat and socially awkward Samantha Evans.

Sarafyan went on to appear in The Twilight Saga: Breaking Dawn – Part 2 as Egyptian vampire Tia, the mate of vampire Benjamin, and as Ani in Lost & Found in Armenia in 2012. She later starred in Paranoia featuring Liam Hemsworth, Gary Oldman, Amber Heard, and Harrison Ford in 2013. The film bombed at the box office and received negative reviews from critics.

Career breakthrough and Westworld (2016–present) 

After guest starring on CBS' Blue Bloods and FXs American Horror Story, Sarafyan appeared in  The Promise, a film about the Armenian genocide in 2016. The same year, Sarafyan was cast as a main cast member on HBO's Westworld as Clementine Pennyfeather.

Following Westworld, Sarafyan received acclaim for her role in the 2018 short film Pin-Up. The short follows Lana Freeman, a celebrated photographer, and her relationship with Sunny. Sarafyan earned over four award wins for her performance. She starred as the lead role of Francesca in We Are Boats, followed by a supporting role as Joanna in the Netflix thriller Extremely Wicked, Shockingly Evil and Vile, and the role of Max in the video game Telling Lies.

Filmography

Film

Television

Video games

Music videos

Web

Awards and nominations

References

External links
 

1983 births
Living people
21st-century Armenian actresses
21st-century American actresses
Armenian film actresses
American film actresses
Armenian television actresses
American television actresses
Soviet emigrants to the United States
Actresses from Yerevan
Armenian emigrants to the United States